Braun's hollyfern (Polystichum braunii) is a species of Polystichum.

It is native to Eurasia and Northern America.

References

External links

braunii